Acinetobacter pragensis is a bacterium from the genus of Acinetobacter which occurs in soil and water.

References

External links
Type strain of Acinetobacter pragensis at BacDive -  the Bacterial Diversity Metadatabase

Moraxellaceae
Bacteria described in 2016